Rudolph and Frosty's Christmas in July (titled on-screen as Rudolph and Frosty: Christmas in July, or simply Rudolph and Frosty) is an American-Japanese Christmas/Independence Day television special produced by Rankin/Bass Productions, featuring characters from the company's holiday specials Rudolph the Red-Nosed Reindeer (1964) and Frosty the Snowman (1969), among others. It was filmed in Japan using the company's trademark "Animagic" stop-motion animation style. The film premiered in the US on November 25, 1979, on ABC.

This was the last Rankin/Bass special to star Billie Mae Richards as Rudolph and Jackie Vernon as Frosty. Mickey Rooney reprised his role as Santa Claus from Santa Claus Is Comin' to Town (1970) and The Year Without a Santa Claus (1974). Additional voices were provided by Red Buttons, Ethel Merman, Alan Sues, and Paul Frees. Shelley Winters and Frees reprised their roles as Frosty's wife Crystal and Jack Frost from Frosty's Winter Wonderland, and Hal Peary reprised his role as Big Ben the Clockwork Whale from Rudolph's Shiny New Year.

This was the final Rankin/Bass special to use Rudolph and Frosty. All other specials/films starring the characters were produced by other companies.

Plot

Long ago, a powerful, evil snow wizard named Winterbolt caused havoc until Lady Boreal, the Queen of the Northern Lights, put him in a deep sleep. Years later, Winterbolt awakens and Boreal transfers the last of her power into Rudolph's red nose when he is born, which will stop glowing if it is ever used for evil. Winterbolt learns of this and plans to dispose of Rudolph. Meanwhile, an ice cream man named Milton arrives and tells Rudolph and Frosty that he plans to marry Lilly Loraine's daughter Lainie if they star in the local circus.

Winterbolt offers Frosty and his family magic amulets to keep them from melting, which will only last until the final firework fades on July 4. Santa agrees to pick them up before the magic wears off, but Winterbolt creates a blizzard to prevent him and Mrs. Claus from arriving on time. He then goes to the Caves of Lost Rejections and recruits an unintelligent, nasty reindeer named Scratcher, who is jealous because he wanted to be one of Santa's reindeer, but was fired when Santa hired Rudolph. They, alongside a man named Sam Spangles, plan to get Rudolph to steal from the circus, which will make him appear to be evil and rid him of his magic.

Meanwhile, Frosty discovers Scratcher's conspiracy and wants to help Rudolph. Winterbolt takes advantage of Frosty as well by agreeing to help Rudolph in exchange for his hat, intending to use it to create an army of evil snowmen. Rudolph manages to defeat Winterbolt, gets the hat back, and his nose regains its glow.

Rudolph returns to the circus with a police officer named Officer Kelly who exonerates him and returns Frosty's hat and the circus money, bringing him back to life. Winterbolt arrives and tries to attack everyone, but Lilly breaks his scepter, causing him to turn into a tree. After this, Sam is arrested, Scratcher disappears, and all of Winterbolt's spells wear off, but Frosty and his family melt as their amulets are no longer active.

However, Rudolph’s old friend Big Ben arrives in time with Jack Frost who brings Frosty and his family back to life. Santa and Mrs. Claus arrive to help Jack Frost take the snow family back home while Rudolph stays behind to help the circus until they’re out of debt and leads the flying circus parade with the circus animals who can now fly with some of Santa’s magic feed corn.

Voice cast

Songs
 "Rudolph the Red-Nosed Reindeer – Chorus
 "Everything I've Always Wanted" – Crystal
 "Everything I've Always Wanted (reprise)" – Milton
 "Everyday Is Just Like Christmas" – Lily
 "Chicken Today And Feathers Tomorrow" – Lily
 "I See Rainbows" – Santa, Chorus
 "Don't Let The Parade Pass You By" – Lily
 "I Heard the Bells on Christmas Day" – Chorus
 "Rockin' Around the Christmas Tree" – Lanie, Chorus
 "Everything I've Always Wanted (second reprise) – Frosty
 "No Bed of Roses" – Rudolph
 "Frosty the Snowman" – Chorus
 "Now And Then" – Frosty
 "We're a Couple of Misfits" – Frosty and Rudolph
 "Rudolph the Red-Nosed Reindeer (reprise)" – Lily, Chorus

References

External links

 
 

1979 television specials
1979 in American television
1970s American television specials
1970s animated television specials
American Broadcasting Company television specials
Christmas television films
Television shows directed by Jules Bass
Television shows directed by Arthur Rankin Jr.
Films scored by Johnny Marks
Circus television shows
Frosty the Snowman television specials
Rudolph the Red-Nosed Reindeer
Santa Claus in television
Rankin/Bass Productions television specials
Animated crossover television specials
Stop-motion animated television shows
Television shows written by Romeo Muller
American Christmas television specials
Animated Christmas television specials
Independence Day (United States) films